Ivan Vladimirovich Pazyomov (born 23 July 1973) is a Russian former professional footballer.

Club career
He made his professional debut in the Russian Premier League in 1992 for FC Torpedo Moscow.

Honours
 Russian Cup winner: 1993.

European club competitions
With FC Torpedo Moscow.

 UEFA Cup 1992–93: 2 games.
 UEFA Cup Winners' Cup 1993–94: 1 game.
 UEFA Cup 1996–97: 2 games.

References

1973 births
Living people
Russian footballers
Russia under-21 international footballers
Russian expatriate footballers
Expatriate footballers in Tunisia
Russian expatriate sportspeople in Tunisia
Russian Premier League players
FC Torpedo Moscow players
FC Torpedo-2 players
FC Tyumen players
FC Tom Tomsk players
Étoile Sportive du Sahel players
Association football forwards